The current Storting was elected at the 2021 Norwegian parliamentary election. As of 17 October 2021.

Members 

 Anette Trettebergstuen (Part of Labour Party, Minister of Culture and Equality)
 Jonas Gahr Støre (Part of Labour Party, Prime Minister of Norway)
 Emilie Enger Mehl (Minister of Justice and Public Security)
 Erna Solberg (Part of Conservative Party, Leader of the Opposition)
 Trygve Slagsvold Vedum (Part of Centre Party, Minister of Finance)
 Bjørnar Moxnes 
 Jon-Ivar Nygård 
 Marte Mjøs Persen 
 Sandra Borch 
 Bjørnar Skjæran 
 Ingvild Kjerkol 
 Kjersti Toppe 
 Espen Barth Eide 
 Henrik Asheim 
 Erlend Svardal Bøe
 Himanshu Gulati
 Jenny Klinge
 Nikolai Astrup

References

See also 

 Støre's Cabinet

Norway
Lists of members of the Storting
2021 establishments in Norway